P. S. Ramamohan Rao (born 31 July 1934) is a former Indian civil servant. He served as the honorable Governor of Tamil Nadu from 18 January 2002 to 4 November 2004. He enlisted in the Indian Police Service in October 1956. He is a retired Director General of Police of Andhra Pradesh. He was awarded the Indian Police Medal in 1974 and the President's Police Medal in 1982.

References

Indian civil servants
Governors of Tamil Nadu
1934 births
Living people
Lieutenant Governors of Puducherry

Telugu people
People from Andhra Pradesh